"Count on Me" is a song recorded by popular American singers and best friends Whitney Houston and CeCe Winans. Co-written and produced by Babyface, it is an uplifting song about leaning on a friend for support when needed. Released in early 1996, the song was the fourth single from the soundtrack album of the motion picture Waiting to Exhale, and the second single by Houston released from that album and its soundtrack. "Count on Me" became Winans's highest-charting single on the US Hot 100, peaking at #8. It was certified gold in the US.

Critical reception
AllMusic editor Craig Lytle wrote, "She (Whitney) teams with Cece Winans on the inspirational duet "Count on Me", and both accomplished singers raise all hopes with their comforting vocals." A reviewer from Billboard deemed the song "torchy". The magazine's Larry Flick commented, "The touch of superstar producer Babyface is, as always, unmistakable, and he excels with this song's lush string arrangement. Vocally, Houston dominates the track, though Winans makes a strong-enough impression that those who have yet to hear her fine recordings will yearn to hear more. A buddy song for the diva generation that is destined to saturate pop radio airwaves into the spring." 

Gil L. Robertson IV from Cash Box picked it as a "standout track" of the soundtrack album. Chicago Tribune editor Greg Kot felt that Winans's is one of the few voices on the album that sounds enraptured. British magazine Music Week rated it four out of five, adding, "a slightly lethargic ballad from the Waiting To Exhale soundtrack but, since everything Houston touches turns to gold, put your money on this reaching the Top 10." Gary Darling from The Orlando Sentinel commented that "with its swelling choruses and shouted pledges of friendship", the song "is infused with We Are the World earnestness and overkill, but the performances save it from being too treacly".

Music video
The accompanying music video for the song features Houston and Winans giving a concert performance, while clips of the Waiting to Exhale feature film are sporadically mixed in. The "Count on Me" music video peaked at number one on music channels BET, MTV, and VH1.

References in pop culture
On a Valentines Day episode of Sister, Sister, the three principal actors: Tia Mowry, Tamera Mowry and Marques Houston, sing the song at a karaoke bar. They sing the first two verses and the chorus.

Charts and certifications

Weekly charts

Year-end charts

Certifications

References

External links
Count on Me
Count on Me at Discogs

1996 singles
1995 songs
Whitney Houston songs
CeCe Winans songs
Female vocal duets
Songs written by Babyface (musician)
Pop ballads
Contemporary R&B ballads
Song recordings produced by Babyface (musician)
Music videos directed by Wayne Isham
Songs about friendship
Gospel songs
Soul ballads
1990s ballads
Songs written by Whitney Houston